Coop & Cami Ask the World is an American comedy television series created by Boyce Bugliari and Jamie McLaughlin that premiered on Disney Channel on October 12, 2018. It stars Dakota Lotus and Ruby Rose Turner as Coop and Cami Wrather, two middle school-aged siblings who crowdsource their decision-making online, with Olivia Sanabia, Albert Tsai, Paxton Booth, and Rebecca Metz also starring. The series ran for two seasons, airing its final episode on September 11, 2020.

Premise 
Coop and Cami Wrather are two middle school-aged siblings who crowdsource their decision-making online. They present two choices for their fan base, which they call the Wratherheads, who chooses which stunt Coop, Cami, Fred, or Ollie have to do.

Episodes

Cast and characters

Main 
 Dakota Lotus as Cooper "Coop" Wrather, the host of Would You Wrather? and Cami's older brother
 Ruby Rose Turner as Cameron "Cami" Wrather, the host of Would You Wrather? and Coop's younger sister
 Olivia Sanabia as Charlotte Wrather, Coop and Cami's older sister
 Albert Tsai as Fred, Coop's best friend
 Paxton Booth as Ollie Wrather, Coop and Cami's younger brother
 Rebecca Metz as Jenna Wrather, Coop and Cami's widowed mother

Recurring 
 Kevin Daniels as Principal Walker, the principal of North Plains Day School
 Jayden Bartels as Peyton, Coop's girlfriend and gaming partner
 Tessa Espinola as Pam, Cami's unpaid assistant who eventually turns against Cami and becomes her nemesis
 Reece Caddell as Minty (season 1), Cami's rival, who is revealed to have been enrolled into a military school at the beginning of the second season
 Gabriella Graves as Delaware, a quirky new student who becomes Cami's friend
 Gianni DeCenzo as Caleb, a nerd boy and Charlotte's first boyfriend
 Trinitee Stokes as Neve, Fred's girlfriend
 Gus de St. Jeor as Dixon (season 2), a hockey player and Charlotte's second boyfriend

Production 
The series was green-lit on May 4, 2018, with an expected premiere in fall 2018. Boyce Bugliari and Jamie McLaughlin serve as showrunners and executive producers. On August 17, 2018, Disney Channel announced that the series would premiere on October 12, 2018. In preparation for the premiere, the series would have a series of challenges in a special event beginning on August 17, 2018, where audiences could vote on social media on what music video from the series they would want to see on-air. The special event would end on September 21, 2018, with the release of a music video and multiple shorts. The music video would feature the theme song and main cast of the series, while the shorts would feature the main cast and other Disney Channel stars participating in "Would You Rather?" type challenges. The series is a production of It's a Laugh Productions. On January 25, 2019, it was announced that Disney Channel renewed the series for a second season. The second season premiered on Disney Channel on October 5, 2019.

Ratings 
 

| link2             = List of Coop & Cami Ask the World episodes#Season 2 (2019)
| episodes2         = 28
| start2            = 
| end2              = 
| startrating2      = 0.51
| endrating2        = 0.43
| viewers2          = |2}} 
}}

References

External links 
 

2010s American children's comedy television series
2020s American children's comedy television series
2018 American television series debuts
2020 American television series endings
Disney Channel original programming
English-language television shows
Television series by It's a Laugh Productions